The Social Democratic Party (PSD-Bassira) is a political party in Niger.

History
The party was launched in 2015 by former minister Mohamed Ben Omar. It did not nominate a presidential candidate in the 2016 general elections, but won two seats in the National Assembly.

Electoral results

National Assembly

References

Political parties in Niger
Political parties established in 2015
2015 establishments in Niger
Social democratic parties